Suresh Chandra Rai  is an Indian geographer.  He is associate professor at the department of geography in the Delhi School of Economics, University of Delhi. He is the Secretary General of the National Association of Geographers of India for the term 2011–12. He was educated at Banaras Hindu University.

References

Living people
Academic staff of Delhi University
Year of birth missing (living people)